Milan Brestovanský (born 18 May 1957 in Trnava) is a Slovak former handball player who competed in the 1988 Summer Olympics.

References

1957 births
Living people
Slovak male handball players
Olympic handball players of Czechoslovakia
Handball players at the 1988 Summer Olympics
Czechoslovak male handball players
Sportspeople from Trnava